is a Japanese actress and woman adventurer. Izumi joined Wakakusa Theatre Company and started her acting career as a child actress at the age of11. Three years later, she moved to Nikkatsu Film company and she became one of the three representative actresses of the Nikkatsu called Nikkatsu Sannin Musume along with Sayuri Yoshinaga and Chieko Matsubara.

In 1963, Izumi starred Kirio Urayama's film Bad Girl and the film won a Golden Prize at the 3rd Moscow International Film Festival.

Selected filmography
 Kojo no Tsuki (1958)
 The Snow Flurry (1959) as Sakura Nagura
 The Seven Challengers (1961)
 The Love Story of Ginza (1962)
 Bad Girl (1963) as Wakae Kita
 Hikaru umi (1963)
 The Bastard (1963) as Emiko Okamura
 Wakakusa Monogatari (1964) as Chieko
 Tattooed Life (1965) as Midori Kinoshita
 The Society (1968) as Mineko Kobayashi
 The Wild Sea (1969)
 Earth Ninja Chronicles: Duel in the Wind (1979)
 Men and War Part2 (1971)
 Blood Vendetta (1971)
 Shin Heike Monogatari (1972) (TV series) as Yomogiko
 Wataru Seken wa Oni Bakari (1998) (TV series)

References

External links 
 

1947 births
Living people
Japanese film actresses
Actresses from Tokyo